PPU may refer to:

Education
Palestine Polytechnic University, Hebron, West Bank
Patliputra University, Patna, India
Point Park University, Pittsburgh, Pennsylvania, US

Science and technology
Physics processing unit, a microprocessor typically used for video games
Picture Processing Unit, the component which generates a video signal in the Nintendo Entertainment System
Power processing unit, a component responsible for regulating electrical power

Other uses
PPU (union), a defunct British pilots' union
Papun Airport, Papun, Myanmar (IATA airport code)
Peace Pledge Union, a British anti-war organisation
People's Protection Units, armed forces of the Kurdish Supreme Committee
Peoria and Pekin Union Railway, Illinois, US
Pirate Party of Ukraine, a political party
The Plastic People of the Universe, a Czech rock band
Price per unit
Prvi Partizan (Prvi partizan Užice), a Serbian ammunition manufacturer